TMA Cargo served the following destinations (as of December 2012):
The airlines ceased its operations in 2014.:

Africa
Egypt
Cairo - Cairo International Airport
Kenya
Nairobi - Jomo Kenyatta International Airport
Sudan
Khartoum - Khartoum International Airport

Asia

Southwest Asia
Bahrain
Bahrain International Airport
Jordan
Amman - Queen Alia International Airport
Kuwait
Kuwait International Airport
Lebanon
Beirut - Beirut Rafic Hariri International Airport Hub
Qatar
Doha - Doha International Airport
Saudi Arabia
Jeddah - King Abdulaziz International Airport
Riyadh - King Khalid International Airport
Syria
Damascus - Damascus International Airport
United Arab Emirates
Dubai - Dubai International Airport

Europe
France
Paris - Charles de Gaulle Airport
Italy
Milan - Malpensa Airport
Netherlands
Amsterdam - Amsterdam Airport Schiphol

Terminated destinations
TMA previously served the following destinations until and before suspending operations in 2004:

Africa
Egypt - Cairo [resumed]
Sudan - Khartoum [resumed]
Uganda - Entebbe

Asia
Afghanistan - Kabul
Bahrain [resumed]
China - Shanghai
Hong Kong
India -  Bombay
Iraq - Baghdad
Japan - Osaka, Tokyo
Kuwait [resumed]
Lebanon - Beirut [resumed]
Malaysia - Kuala Lumpur
Oman - Muscat
Pakistan - Karachi
Philippines - Manila
Qatar - Doha [resumed]
Saudi Arabia - Dhahran, Jeddah [resumed], Riyadh [resumed]
Singapore
South Korea - Seoul
Taiwan - Taipei
Thailand - Bangkok-Don Mueang
United Arab Emirates - Dubai, Sharjah

Europe
Austria - Vienna
Belgium - Brussels, Ostend
Denmark - Copenhagen
Finland - Helsinki
France - Bordeaux, Lyon, Marseilles, Paris-Orly, Toulouse
Germany - Berlin, Düsseldorf, Frankfurt, Hamburg, Munich, Stuttgart
Hungary- Sármellék
Italy - Bergamo, Rome
Luxembourg
Netherlands - Amsterdam
Norway - Oslo
Portugal - Lisbon
Russia - Moscow-Sheremetyevo
Spain - Madrid
Sweden - Stockholm
Switzerland - Basel, Geneva, Zürich 
United Kingdom - London-Heathrow

North America
Canada - Montreal
United States of America - Anchorage, New York-JFK

References

Lists of airline destinations